John Landyran MD DD (fl. 1370s) was a Canon of Windsor from 1375 to 1376

Career

He was appointed:
Prebendary of St Thomas the Martyr, Glasney 1376
Prebendary of the King’s Free Chapel of Hastings 1376

He was appointed to the first stall in St George's Chapel, Windsor Castle in 1375 and held the canonry until 1376.

Notes 

Canons of Windsor